The  was an area army of the Imperial Japanese Army during the Second Sino-Japanese War.

History
On November 7, 1937 Japanese Central China Area Army (CCAA) was organized as a reinforcement expeditionary army by combining the  Shanghai Expeditionary Army (SEF) and the IJA Tenth Army.  General Iwane Matsui was appointed as its commander-in-chief, concurrent with his assignment as commander-in-chief of the SEF. Matsui reported directly to Imperial General Headquarters. After the Battle of Nanjing in December 1937, CCAA forces perpetrated the Nanjing Massacre, in which an estimated 200,000 people were brutally murdered. The CCAA was disbanded on February 14, 1938 and its component units were reassigned to the Central China Expeditionary Army.

List of Commanders

Commanding officer

Chief of Staff

References

C
Military units and formations established in 1937
Military units and formations disestablished in 1938
Nanjing Massacre perpetrators